Danshin Ruchey is a rural locality (a village) in Pokrovskoye Rural Settlement, Vashkinsky District, Vologda Oblast, Russia. The population was 36 as of 2002.

Geography 
Danshin Ruchey is located 71 km northwest of Lipin Bor (the district's administrative centre) by road. Pokrovskoye is the nearest rural locality.

References 

Rural localities in Vashkinsky District